Oscar Lawrence Fuhr (August 22, 1893 – March 27, 1975) was a pitcher in Major League Baseball who played between  and  for the Chicago Cubs (1921) and Boston Red Sox (1924–25). He was born in Defiance, Missouri.

In a three-season career, Fuhr posted a 3–12 record with 59 strikeouts and a 6.35 ERA in 63 appearances, including 16 starts, four complete games, one shutout, 28 games finished, 69 walks, and 175⅔ innings of work.

Fuhr died in Dallas, Texas at age 81.

Sources

Retrosheet

Boston Red Sox players
Chicago Cubs players
Major League Baseball pitchers
Baseball players from Missouri
1893 births
1975 deaths
People from St. Charles County, Missouri
Nashville Vols players